The 1995–96 Algerian Championnat National was the 34th season of the Algerian Championnat National since its establishment in 1962. A total of 16 teams contested the league, with JS Kabylie as the defending champions, The Championnat started on September 14, 1995. and ended on August, 1996.

Team summaries

Promotion and relegation 
Teams promoted from Algerian Division 2 1995-1996 
 MO Constantine
 NA Hussein Dey
 WA Mostaganem

Teams relegated to Algerian Division 2 1996-1997
 USM Blida
 ASM Oran
 JS Bordj Ménaïel

League table

References

External links
1995–96 Algerian Championnat National

Algerian Championnat National
Championnat National
Algerian Ligue Professionnelle 1 seasons